Centreville is a community in the Canadian province of Nova Scotia, located in the Municipality of the District of Digby in Digby County on Digby Neck.

References
 Centreville on Destination Nova Scotia

Communities in Digby County, Nova Scotia
General Service Areas in Nova Scotia